The St. Francis Terriers men's soccer team represents St. Francis College, which is located in Brooklyn Heights, New York. The team is a member of the Division I Northeast Conference (NEC). The Terriers play their home games at Brooklyn Bridge Park on Pier 5, which is also located in Brooklyn Heights. The field is on the East River and has the Manhattan Skyline as a backdrop.

The current head coach, Justine Lombardi, joined the Terriers in 2018 and in 2019 will field the inaugural Terriers squad.

History

The Terriers play their home games at Brooklyn Bridge Park on Pier 5, which is also located in Brooklyn Heights. The field is located on the East River and has the Manhattan Skyline as a backdrop.

The current head coach, Justine Lombardi, joined the Terriers in 2018 as the first coach in program history. Prior to joining the Terriers she was an assistant coach for six seasons at her alma mater, Quinnipiac. She spent her first year recruiting and in 2019 will field the inaugural Terriers squad.

The program's first game was played against Lafayette at Brooklyn Bridge Park on August 22, 2019. The Terriers lost in overtime 0–1 against the Leopards. The Terriers first goal was scored by Henriette Lykke, against the Iona Gaels on September 18, 2019, in a 2–3 loss. In their inaugural season, the Terriers did not win a game and posted a 0–17–0 record.

Seasons

Terrier records

Record vs. NEC opponents

References

External links
 

 
2019 establishments in New York City
21st century in Brooklyn
Association football clubs established in 2019